Kerry or Kerri may refer to:
 Kerry (name), a given name and surname of Gaelic origin (including a list of people with the name)

Places
 Kerry, Queensland, Australia
 County Kerry, Ireland
 Kerry Airport, an international airport in County Kerry, Ireland
 Kerry, Powys, Wales, UK
 Kerry quarter, Cambridge, Massachusetts, US
 Kerry Park, Seattle, Washington, US

Brands and enterprises
 Kerry Group, a food company in Ireland
 Kerry Media, a newspaper and publications group
 Kerry Properties, a property developer in Hong Kong

Constituencies
Kerry (Dáil constituency)
Kerry (Parliament of Ireland constituency)
Kerry (UK Parliament constituency)

Other uses
 Earl of Kerry, an ancient title in the Peerage of Ireland
 Kerry GAA, a governing body of Gaelic games in County Kerry
 Kerry F.C. (disambiguation), two unrelated football teams
 Kerry, a front end for Beagle desktop search software

See also 
 Ceri (disambiguation)
 Kelley (disambiguation)
 Kelly (disambiguation)
 Keri (disambiguation)